Homaeotarsus is a genus of rove beetles in the family Staphylinidae. There are about 16 described species in Homaeotarsus.

Species
These 16 species belong to the genus Homaeotarsus:

 Homaeotarsus badius b
 Homaeotarsus bicolor b
 Homaeotarsus carolinus (Erichson, 1840) g
 Homaeotarsus ceylanensis Kraatz, 1859 c g
 Homaeotarsus chaudoirii Hochhuth, 1851 g
 Homaeotarsus cinctus (Say, 1830) b
 Homaeotarsus cribratus (LeConte, 1863) g b
 Homaeotarsus denticulatus Assing V.,2009 c g
 Homaeotarsus floridanus b
 Homaeotarsus japonicus Sharp, 1874 c g
 Homaeotarsus kurosai Ito, 1996 c g
 Homaeotarsus marginatus Motschulsky, 1858 c g
 Homaeotarsus pallipes (Gravenhorst, 1802) g b
 Homaeotarsus parallelus b
 Homaeotarsus sellatus (LeConte, 1863) g b
 Homaeotarsus strenuus b

Data sources: i = ITIS, c = Catalogue of Life, g = GBIF, b = Bugguide.net

References

Further reading

External links

 

Paederinae